Henry Asbury Christian (February 17, 1876 – August 24, 1951), was an American professor of pathology named in the condition Hand–Schüller–Christian disease.

Biography
Henry Asbury Christian was born in Lynchburg, Virginia on February 17, 1876. He earned A.B. and A.M. degrees from Randolph–Macon College in 1895, an M.D. from Johns Hopkins University in 1900, and an A.M. from Harvard in 1903.

He married Elizabeth Sears Seabury on June 30, 1921.

He died while on vacation in Whitefield, New Hampshire on August 24, 1951, and was interred in Mount Auburn Cemetery.

References

External links 

 Henry A. Christian papers, 1876-1951 (inclusive). H MS b68. Harvard Medical Library, Francis A. Countway Library of Medicine, Boston, Mass.

1876 births
1951 deaths
American pathologists
Burials at Mount Auburn Cemetery
Harvard Medical School faculty
Harvard University alumni
Johns Hopkins School of Medicine alumni
Randolph–Macon College alumni
Randolph–Macon College faculty